Cristian Gigi Brăneț (born 14 July 1977) is a Romanian former footballer who played as a goalkeeper for teams such as Dunărea Galați, Politehnica Iași or Oțelul Galați, among others.

Honours
FC Vaslui
Liga III: 2002–03
Politehnica Iași
Liga II: 2003–04
Oțelul Galați
Liga I: 2010–11

External links
 
 
 

1977 births
Living people
Romanian footballers
Association football goalkeepers
Liga I players
Liga II players
FCM Dunărea Galați players
ASC Oțelul Galați players
FC Vaslui players
FC Politehnica Iași (1945) players
Liga Leumit players
Hapoel Tzafririm Holon F.C. players
Romanian expatriate footballers
Romanian expatriate sportspeople in Israel
Expatriate footballers in Israel
Romanian football managers
Sportspeople from Galați